Dora Gómez Bueno de Acuña (1903 in Luque – 1987) was a Paraguayan poet, journalist and radio personality. She carried out her studies in Escuela Normal de Asunción, the institute where she graduated with the title of teacher.

Influenced by the Uruguayan poet Delmira Agustini, Dora Acuña's poetry celebrated life and nature with a frank eroticism.

First Steps 
She taught primary education for many years, and briefly contributed, between 1930 and 1931, to the 'Sociales' page of the 'El Orden' newspaper of Asunción.

Her participation in radio programs was extensive and fruitful, as an actress in children's programs, as a reciter of native and foreign poetry, through the innumerable radio series throughout her life, of which "Sobremesa de Gala" stands out, which was broadcast successfully by Radio Nacional, and by Radio Ñanduti, both stations of the Paraguayan capital.

Works
 Flor de caña, poesías (Reed flower), Asunción: Imprenta nacional, 1940
 Barro celeste (Heavenly mud), Asunción: Imprenta nacional, 1943
 Luz en el abismo (Light in the Abyss), Asunción: Indoamericana, 1954
 Vivir es decir (Living is saying), Asunción: [s.n.], 1977
 Antología, Asunción: Alcándara, 1985

See also
Culture of Paraguay

References

1903 births
1987 deaths
People from Luque
Paraguayan women poets
20th-century Paraguayan women writers
20th-century Paraguayan poets